Sooner or Later is the third studio album by American singer-actor Rex Smith, released in 1979 by Columbia Records, and it also serves as a soundtrack album to the 1979 made-for-television film of the same name, starring Smith and Denise Miller.

The album peaked at number 19 on the Billboard albums chart on June 23, 1979  and spawned the hit singles: "You Take My Breath Away", "Simply Jessie" and "Never Gonna Give You Up".

Track listing
The first four soundtrack songs were featured in the film Sooner or Later.

Charts

References

1979 albums
1979 soundtrack albums
Rex Smith albums
Columbia Records albums
Columbia Records soundtracks
Albums produced by Charles Calello
Romance film soundtracks
Drama film soundtracks